Angela McShane is a senior research fellow and Head of Renaissance and Early Modern Studies at the Victoria and Albert Museum, the V&A/Sheffield University Research and External Engagement Fellow, and an Associate Fellow of Early Modern History at Warwick University.

In December 2016 McShane was on the expert panel for BBC Radio 4's In Our Time on the Gin Craze.

Selected publications

References 

Academics of the University of Sheffield
Academics of the University of Warwick
British curators
British women historians
Living people
Year of birth missing (living people)